STZ may refer to:

 Snowbird Tectonic Zone, a geological boundary in the Canadian Shield
 Stalingrad Tractor Factory (Russian: Stalingradskiy traktornyy zavod), now known as Volgograd Tractor Factory
 Stanozolol (STZ), an anabolic steroid
 Streptozotocin (streptozocin, STZ, Zanosar) is a naturally occurring chemical
 STZ, NYSE ticker symbol for Constellation Brands
 STZ TV, a Brazilian TV station